Richard Keith Bolton (born 4 June 1943) is a New Zealand former rugby league footballer, manager, and coach who represented New Zealand.

Playing career
Bolton was an Auckland representative and played in one Test match for the New Zealand national rugby league team, the second Test against Australia in 1972. He captained the New Zealand Māori side which won the 1975 Pacific Cup.

Coaching career
After retirement Bolton turned to coaching. He coached the New Zealand Māori side to wins in the 1986 and 1988 Pacific Cups, and also coached Waikato in 1987 and 1988. During this time, Bolton also served on the New Zealand Māori Rugby League board between 1983 and 1984. He later served as trainer of the 1990 New Zealand Māori side.

Later years
Bolton served as the manager of the New Zealand national rugby league team in 1992 and 1993 under coach Howie Tamati.

In 1994, he was employed by the New Zealand Rugby League as the National Development Officer. In this role he is credited with establishing the National Secondary Schools competition. He retired from this role in 1997.

However Bolton returned to the role in 2002 and also managed the Junior Kiwis in 2005. In 2009 he was the Auckland Rugby League's Deputy Chairman.

References

New Zealand rugby league players
New Zealand Māori rugby league players
New Zealand Māori rugby league team players
New Zealand national rugby league team players
Auckland rugby league team players
New Zealand rugby league coaches
New Zealand Māori rugby league team coaches
Waikato rugby league team coaches
New Zealand rugby league administrators
Living people
Rugby league locks
1943 births